Radical may refer to:

Politics and ideology

Politics
Radical politics, the political intent of fundamental societal change
Radicalism (historical), the Radical Movement that began in late 18th century Britain and spread to continental Europe and Latin America in the 19th century
Radical Party (disambiguation), several political parties
Radicals (UK), a British and Irish grouping in the early to mid-19th century
Radicalization

Ideologies
Radical chic, a term coined by Tom Wolfe to describe the pretentious adoption of radical causes
Radical feminism, a perspective within feminism that focuses on patriarchy
Radical Islam, or Islamic extremism
Radical veganism, a radical interpretation of veganism, usually combined with anarchism
Radical Reformation, an Anabaptist movement concurrent with the Protestant Reformation

Science and mathematics

Science
Radical (chemistry), an atom, molecule, or ion with unpaired valence electron(s)
Radical surgery, where diseased tissue or lymph nodes are removed from a diseased organ

Mathematics
Radical expression involving roots, also known as an nth root
Radical symbol (√), used to indicate the square root and other roots
Radical of an algebraic group, a concept in algebraic group theory
Radical of an ideal, an important concept in abstract algebra
Radical of a ring, an ideal of "bad" elements of a ring
Jacobson radical, consisting of those elements in a ring R that annihilate all simple right R-modules
Nilradical of a ring, a nilpotent ideal which is as large as possible
Radical of a module, a component in the theory of structure and classification
Radical of an integer, in number theory, the product of the primes which divide an integer
Radical of a Lie algebra, a concept in Lie theory
Nilradical of a Lie algebra, a nilpotent ideal which is as large as possible
Left (or right) radical of a bilinear form, the subspace of all vectors left (or right) orthogonal to every vector

Linguistics
Root (linguistics), also called a "radical", the form of a word after any prefixes and suffixes are removed
Radical (Chinese characters), part of a Chinese character 
Radical consonant, a pharyngeal consonant
Radical, one of the three consonants in a Semitic root

Arts and entertainment

Music
Radical (mixtape), by Odd Future, 2010
Radical (Every Time I Die album), 2021
Radical (Smack album), 1988
"Radicals", a song by Tyler, The Creator from the 2011 album Goblin

Architecture and design 

 Radical period (design), a period in late 1960s Italian design
 Radical Baroque, an architectural style

Literature 

Radical: My Journey out of Islamist Extremism, by Maajid Nawaz, 2013
Radical (book), by David Platt, 2010

Other uses
Murphy Radical, a Canadian light aircraft design
Radical, Missouri, U.S., a ghost town
Radical, North Carolina, U.S.
Radical Sportscars, a British sports car maker
Radical Entertainment, a Canadian video game developer
Radical.fm, a digital music streaming service

See also

 The Radicalz, a World Wrestling Federation stable
 Radical center (disambiguation)
 Radical left (disambiguation)
 Radical right (disambiguation)
 Radikal (disambiguation)
 Radicle, the first part of a seedling